Saint-Quentin-sur-Indrois (literally Saint-Quentin on Indrois) is a commune in the Indre-et-Loire department in central France.

Geography
The village lies in the middle of the commune, on the right bank of the Indrois, which flows west through the middle of the commune.

Population

See also
Communes of the Indre-et-Loire department

References

Communes of Indre-et-Loire